Fabio Quartararo (born 20 April 1999), nicknamed El Diablo, is a French Grand Prix motorcycle rider racing in MotoGP for Monster Energy Yamaha MotoGP. Having won the 2021 MotoGP World Championship, he is the first French World Champion in the premier class' history.

Prior to his Grand Prix career, Quartararo won six Spanish junior championship titles, including successive CEV Moto3 titles in 2013 and 2014. Due to his successes at a young age, he has been tipped for "big things", even being compared to multiple time world champion Marc Márquez, and set various age records during his progress up to World Championship level. He failed to meet the high expectations in the Moto3 and Moto2 World Championships, but made the move up to MotoGP with Petronas Yamaha SRT, and finished as rookie of the year in 2019 with seven podiums and 5th place in the overall standings. After collecting 3 victories in the compressed 2020 season, Quartararo moved up to the Yamaha Factory Racing Team for 2021 replacing Valentino Rossi, and managed to win the championship in his first season collecting 5 victories and 10 podiums.

Biography
Of Italian origin, as he was born into a Sicilian family moved to France, he can be considered a son of art: his father, Étienne, competed in the 1986 French motorcycle Grand Prix in the 250 class. On 14 July 2022 he was awarded a knight of the Legion of Honour.

Career

Early career
Born in Nice, Quartararo started his career in his native France at the age of 4. He later moved to Spain to compete in the Promovelocidad Cup, a series for young riders organised by the Real Automóvil Club de Cataluña (RACC). He won championship titles in the series' 50cc class in 2008, the 70cc class in 2009, and the 80cc class in 2011. Prior to moving into the senior Moto3 series in Spain, Quartararo won the Mediterranean pre-Moto3 class in 2012, which was also denoted as the Spanish domestic championship.

CEV Repsol career
Moving into the Moto3 class of the CEV Repsol series in 2013, Quartararo joined Wild Wolf Racing – run by former Grand Prix racer Juan Borja – riding a Honda. Quartararo finished on the podium in his maiden race in the series, run in wet conditions, finishing second to Great Britain's Wayne Ryan at Circuit de Barcelona-Catalunya. Quartararo finished sixth in the second race at the circuit, and left tied for the championship lead with Dutch rider Bryan Schouten. Over the next four races, Quartararo recorded only one top-ten finish – from pole position at Navarra – and had dropped to eighth in the riders' championship standings, 37 points behind Spain's Marcos Ramírez. Quartararo finished the season strongly however, winning each of the final three races from pole position – his first series wins – defeating Ramírez by almost ten seconds in the final race at Jerez.

Quartararo remained in the CEV Repsol championship for the 2014 season, as he was not old enough to graduate to the World Championship level. Quartararo continued riding a Honda in the series, but moved to the Estrella Galicia 0,0 junior team run by Emilio Alzamora, the  125cc world champion. Quartararo finished the season as a clear champion, winning nine of the season's eleven races, and finishing second – to María Herrera at Jerez and Jorge Navarro at Albacete – in the other two. His eventual championship-winning margin was 127 points over Navarro, who joined him as his team-mate at the final round of the season in Valencia. At that final round, Quartararo also beat World Championship competitors Alexis Masbou and John McPhee, with their SaxoPrint-RTG team making a one-off appearance in the championship.

Quartararo's performances in the Spanish series were noted at World Championship level. In the race which supported the 2014 French Grand Prix at Le Mans, Quartararo won by almost four seconds over nine laps, leading almost the entire race having started from second on the grid. In August 2014, the Grand Prix Commission – consisting of representatives from Dorna Sports, the Fédération Internationale de Motocyclisme (FIM), the International Road-Racing Teams Association (IRTA) and the Motorcycle Sports Manufacturers' Association (MSMA) – announced a change to the previously introduced age eligibility rules, allowing for the champion of the FIM CEV Moto3 championship (regardless of age) to compete in the succeeding season of the Moto3 World Championship.

Moto3 World Championship

Estrella Galicia 0,0 (2015)

Quartararo was announced to be joining the Moto3 World Championship in October 2014, with the publication of the championship's initial entry list. He remained with the Estrella Galicia 0,0 outfit, again riding a Honda, that he won that season's Spanish title with, and he was joined by Jorge Navarro, his closest rival in those championship standings. He tested the team's Moto3 motorcycle for the first time in post-season testing in Valencia, but his first lap times were not provided due to the fact that he tested without a transponder. During the first day of official pre-season tests at Valencia in 2015, Quartararo set the fastest time in the third session. At the following three-day test at Jerez, Quartararo was fastest in five of nine sessions, including a clean sweep on the final day.

At his opening race weekend in Qatar, Quartararo qualified on the second row of the grid in sixth position, just 0.123 seconds away from the pole-setting time recorded by countryman Alexis Masbou. In the race, Quartararo was ever-present in the lead group, and held the lead of the race with two laps to go, but contact with Francesco Bagnaia saw both riders slip down the running order, with Quartararo ultimately finishing the race in seventh position. Such was the close nature of the racing that Quartararo was just 0.772 seconds behind the race winner, Masbou. At the following event in Austin, Texas, Quartararo achieved his first podium finish, with a second-place finish behind Danny Kent. He achieved his first pole position at the Spanish Grand Prix, a tenth of a second clear of Kent, but finished the race in fourth place. On home soil at Le Mans, Quartararo again took pole position, by just over a tenth of a second from team-mate Navarro. He led for a period during the race, but ultimately high-sided out of it from fourth position.

Quartararo returned to the podium with a second-place finish at Assen, having been part of the lead group for the entire race; he finished 0.066 seconds behind race winner Miguel Oliveira. In the next four races, Quartararo alternated retirements with finishes of eleventh at Indianapolis and fourth at Silverstone. At Misano, Quartararo crashed during the second free practice session, fracturing his right ankle – missing the race as a result of the injury. Quartararo also missed the following race in Aragon, where he was replaced by the team's CEV Moto3 rider Sena Yamada. Quartararo returned for the Japanese Grand Prix, but withdrew from the race after qualifying 29th on the grid, due to continued pain. Quartararo also pulled out of the Australian Grand Prix, after qualifying 19th on the grid. Quartararo ultimately finished the season in tenth place, with ninety-two points.

Leopard Racing (2016)
On 26 September 2015, it was announced that Quartararo would leave the Estrella Galicia 0,0 team to join Leopard Racing on a two-year contract from the 2016 season. Quartararo was considered as the title favorite for the season because of his performance in his rookie year and also because of the Leopard Racing team which won the previous year title with Danny Kent. But the season become a disastrous year for Quartararo. In the first three races Quartararo finished in thirteenth place followed by a crash in Spain. Quartararo finished sixth at his home race at Le Mans. Quartararo went pointless in six races and his best result being a fourth-place finish at Austria.

Moto2 World Championship

Pons Racing (2017)

Quartararo changed from Moto3 to Moto2 in 2017 to the Pons Racing as a teammate of Edgar Pons. On his debut, Quartararo finished 7th in Qatar. His only better result of the season was 6th place in San Marino. He finished the season with 64 points in 13th place of the championship.

Speed Up Racing (2018)

For 2018, Quartararo switched to the Speed Up Racing team. He achieved his first-ever Grand Prix victory in Catalunya. Despite success in the following race with a 2nd place in Assen, the remainder of his season was difficult, achieving no further podiums and finishing with 138 points in 10th place of the championship.

MotoGP World Championship

Petronas Yamaha SRT (2019–2020)

2019

In August 2018, it was announced that Quartararo would join Franco Morbidelli at the newly created Yamaha satellite team, Petronas Yamaha SRT, in 2019. He would be intended to riding with a 2018-spec Yamaha. However, Yamaha gave him a factory-spec Yamaha - known as the "Spec-B".

He qualified on pole position for the Spanish Grand Prix. With this pole position he took the record for youngest ever polesitter in the MotoGP class, a record previously held by Marc Márquez since 2013. He also qualified on pole position in Catalunya (ultimately finishing the race in second place) and the following race in Assen, setting a new lap record and becoming the youngest rider with consecutive pole positions in MotoGP history. He finished third in Assen, behind Maverick Viñales and Marc Márquez. The next race at the Sachsenring, he qualified second, behind Marc Márquez. During the second lap of the race Quartararo slumped in the third corner while sitting on the inside with Danilo Petrucci. He ended up in the gravel. This crash was the first crash during a race in his rookie season in MotoGP. Quartararo achieved further podium finishes on the season with a third place in Austria and four second-place finishes in San Marino, Thailand, Japan, and Valencia. He started from pole position in Thailand, Malaysia, and Valencia. Quartararo ultimately finished the season in 5th place of the riders' standings with 192 points, 7 podiums, and 6 pole positions.

2020
At the first race of the delayed 2020 season in Jerez, Quartararo qualified on pole position and went on to take his maiden victory in the premier class after briefly dropping as low as 5th place on the opening lap. At the second round of the Jerez double-header Quartararo repeated the statistic by qualifying on pole and winning the race, this time leading from the outset and building a lead of over 8 seconds by the 20th lap before cruising to the finish by 4.5 seconds over Maverick Viñales. After difficulties in the subsequent five races, Quartararo saw his early championship advantage erode by the mid-point of the season. He achieved his third win at the Catalunya round to retake the championship lead. At the first Aragon round he suffered an injured hip after an FP3 highside crash but was cleared by medical staff to take part in qualifying, where he went on to take pole position. Lingering pain and struggles with the front tire in the track conditions caused him to drop quickly down the back, ultimately finishing in 18th place, his first non-retirement finish outside of the points in MotoGP since his first-ever race in Qatar.

Monster Energy Yamaha MotoGP (2021–present)

2021 
After a rookie season in MotoGP, Yamaha Factory Racing announced on 29 January 2020 that Quartararo would replace Valentino Rossi beginning with the 2021 season and that he would receive factory-supported machinery for his remaining season at Petronas Yamaha SRT.

Quartararo started the season at Losail with a fifth place and a win in two consecutive weekends. Two weeks later in Portimao he qualified for the pole position (after Francesco Bagnaia's lap was invalidated) and led the race for the last 17 of 25 laps for his second win of the season. Quartararo would take Pole once again in Jerez, and was leading the race comfortably halfway through, when he started to suffer arm pump problems, and fell back the order, only finishing the race in 13th while Jack Miller took the win. After a successful surgery, Quartararo qualified in Pole Position in Le Mans, his third consecutive Pole, after a difficult practice session. During the race, due to unexpected weather changes and the rain starting to come down, Quartararo along with other riders switched bikes, however he was penalised with a long lap penalty when he pulled into Maverick Viñales garage instead of his own. Despite the penalty he managed to finish his home GP in 3rd, with fellow countryman Johann Zarco taking second and Jack Miller first.

Quartararo would once again take pole position, a fourth consecutive time, at the Italian Grand Prix in Mugello, but the weekend was overshadowed by the passing of Moto3 rider Jason Dupasquier, who died after an accident in pre-race qualifying. Quartararo won the race, achieving his third win of the season and dedicated both the pole and win to Dupasquier. In Catalunya, Quartararo once again took pole position for a fifth consecutive time, something which hasn't been done in the premier class since Marc Márquez did so in 2014. He finished in 3rd but was demoted to 4th after being given a 3-second penalty for taking a shortcut, and he was then given another 3 second penalty post-race, for riding with his leather suit open. The zipper was down and Quartararo removed his chest protector, breaching race rules requiring protective equipment to be worn correctly at all times, thus demoting Quartararo to 6th place. Quartararo further solidified his championship lead with a 3rd place at the Sachsenring, a win at Assen, and a third place in Spielberg.

Quartararo would win his fifth race of the season in Silverstone, and with two second-place finishes in Rimini, and Austin, he had a 52-point gap to Francesco Bagnaia, with 3 races to go. Bagnaia would lead with 5 laps to go in Misano, but crashed out, ending his title fight, and confirming Quartararo won the title with 2 full races to go.

2022 
At the start of the season, he struggled a lot with his bike. He managed to set the pole position time in Mandalika with 0.2 seconds ahead of Jorge Martín. That's the only pole position for the french man in 2022. He won three races before the summer break, including Portugal Grand Prix, Catalan Grand Prix, and German Grand Prix.
By the end of the season, he finished with 248 points, 8 podiums, and three DNFs.  
Quartararo finished in second place in the final standings behind Francesco Bagnaia.

2023 
On 2 June 2022, Quartararo signed a contract extension with the team for 2023 and 2024.

Career statistics

Pre-Grand Prix career highlights
 2007: 2nd, FCM Copa Catalana de Promovelocitat (Promo RACC) Spanish 50cc championship
 2008: 1st, FCM Copa Catalana de Promovelocitat (Promo RACC) Spanish 50cc championship
 2009: 1st, FCM Copa Catalana de Promovelocitat (Promo RACC) Spanish 70cc championship
 2010: 3rd, FCM Campeonato del Mediterraneo Velocidad (CMV) Mediterranean/N.Spanish 80cc championship
 2011: 1st, FCM/RACC Campeonat del Mediterrani de Velocitat (CMV) Mediterranean/N. Spanish 80cc championship
 2012: 1st, FCM/RACC Campeonat del Mediterrani de Velocitat (CMV) Mediterranean/N. Spanish Pre-Moto3 championship

FIM CEV Moto3 Junior World Championship

Races by year
(key) (Races in bold indicate pole position; races in italics indicate fastest lap)

Grand Prix motorcycle racing

By season

By class

Races by year
(key) (Races in bold indicate pole position; races in italics indicate fastest lap)

Personal life 
Fabio Quartararo currently resides in Andorra.

References

External links

 

French motorcycle racers
1999 births
Living people
Moto3 World Championship riders
Sportspeople from Nice
Moto2 World Championship riders
Sepang Racing Team MotoGP riders
French people of Sicilian descent
MotoGP World Championship riders
Yamaha Motor Racing MotoGP riders
MotoGP World Riders' Champions